The Second Djumhana Cabinet was the third cabinet established by the State of Pasundan. It was composed of eight ministers. Its term of office ran from 31 January to 18 July 1949.

Background
After the Dutch managed to force the resignation of the First Djumhana Cabinet on 28 January 1949, Djumhana was left with only two ministers. The only way in which Djumhana could form a new cabinet was by dropping his former program and substituting it with an extremely mild one. 

The program of the Second Djumhana Cabinet which he formed at the beginning of February called for the establishment of a sovereign and free federal Indonesia as soon as possible and formation of an interim government in which the Republic of Indonesia would take part.

Composition

Ministers

The end of the cabinet
On 16 July 1949, the Indonesia, Unity, Indonesian Nationhood Party and the Pasundan People's Party in the Parliament of Pasundan were united to form a "National Front". The front stated that they demand the entire cabinet to resign and for the prime minister to form a new cabinet on a broader basis. The cabinet officially resigned on 18 July 1949, after the installation of the Third Djumhana Cabinet.

Bibliography

References

Notes 

Cabinets established in 1949
Cabinets disestablished in 1949
Cabinets of Pasundan